Herbert Joseph Franta (March 10, 1905 – August 3, 1950) was an American football player, a tackle and guard in the National Football League.

Biography
Franta was born on March 10, 1905, in Minnesota. His nickname was "Chief".

Career
Franta played with the Minneapolis Red Jackets during the 1929 NFL season before splitting the following season between the Red Jackets and the Green Bay Packers. As such, he was a member of the 1930 NFL Champion Packers. He died in a car crash in 1950 on his way to Chicago to move his family.

He played at college level at the University of St. Thomas.

See also
List of Green Bay Packers players

References

1905 births
1950 deaths
Players of American football from Minnesota
Minneapolis Red Jackets players
Green Bay Packers players
American football offensive guards
University of St. Thomas (Minnesota) alumni
St. Thomas (Minnesota) Tommies football players